At least two destroyers of the Imperial Japanese Navy have been named Tanikaze  ("valley wind"):

, a  launched in 1918 and discarded in 1934.
, a  launched in 1940 and sunk in 1944.

Japanese Navy ship names
Imperial Japanese Navy ship names